Dunsby is a small village and civil parish in the South Kesteven district of in Lincolnshire, England. In 2001 it had a population of 141, reducing to 122 at the 2011 census.

The Grade I listed parish church is dedicated to All Saints. Built of ironstone and limestone, it dates from the 12th century, and was restored in 1857. The church is part of the Ringstone in Aveland group of the Deanery of Beltisloe, Diocese of Lincoln. The vicar was the Revd Dr Lynda Pugh between 2012 and 2018. The incumbent is the Revd Neil Bullen.

Dunsby is mentioned in the Domesday Book under the name of Dunesbe.

References

Literature
Honniball P (2021) HISTORY OF DUNSBY, a village in South Lincolnshire and of some of the people who have lived there. Privately published 340pp.

External links

Villages in Lincolnshire
Civil parishes in Lincolnshire
South Kesteven District